Thorsten Judt (born 30 June 1971) is a German former professional footballer who played as a midfielder.

References

1971 births
Living people
German footballers
Association football midfielders
Bundesliga players
2. Bundesliga players
3. Liga players
Bayer 04 Leverkusen II players
Fortuna Düsseldorf players
Rot-Weiß Oberhausen players
Kickers Offenbach players
FC Rot-Weiß Erfurt players